Otac is a village in Rezina District, Moldova.

References

Villages of Rezina District